G.A.M.E. is a compilation album by American hip hop recording artist the Game. It was released independently on March 21, 2006, for Get Low Recordz. G.A.M.E. peaked at #151 on the Billboard 200, #31 on the Top R&B/Hip-Hop Albums and #14 on Independent Albums. This album was released without Game's permission by J.T the Bigga Figga causing a lawsuit and Game encouraging fans not to buy it, but instead download it. Bootleg and Shoestring of the Dayton Family featured on 3 songs from the album.

Track listing

External links
[ Billboard.com]

References

2006 albums
The Game (rapper) albums